Drumcode Records is a Swedish techno label managed by Adam Beyer.  The label was founded in 1996 and has enjoyed a streak of success in its releases, talent scouting, radio efforts, and general international label camaraderie ever since.  As of August 2018 the label is the highest-selling techno record label on Beatport over the past year, according to BeatStats, and third highest-selling label on Beatport of all time.  Its roots are in its native Scandinavia, originally only housing Swedish producers, but in the label's history it has since branched out to working with those whose sound fit the profile, rather than whose nationality aligns best.

Artists 

 Adam Beyer
 Alan Fitzpatrick
 Alias
 Amelie Lens
 Bart Skils
 Boxia
 Cari Lekebusch
 Christian Smith 
 Dense & Pika
 Enrico Sangiuliano
 Green Velvet
 Harvey McKay
 Hertz (Pierre Jerksten)
 Hyperloop
 Ida Engberg
 Ilario Alicante
 Jay Lumen
 Jerome Sydenham
 Jesper Dahlbäck
 Joey Beltram
 Joseph Capriati
 Julian Jeweil
 Kaiserdisco
 Layton Giordani
 Maceo Plex
 Manic Brothers
 Marco Carola
 Marco Faraone
 Mark Reeve
 Nicole Moudaber
 Pan-Pot
 Pig&Dan
 Ramiro Lopez
 Sam Paganini
 Slam
 Steve Lawler
 Timmo
 Victor Calderone
 Victor Ruiz
 Vinicius Honorio
 Wehbba

Podcast 
Label owner Adam Beyer also hosts the techno podcast Drumcode Radio Live.

See also 
 List of record labels

References

External links
 Official site

Drumcode
Record labels established in 1996
Techno record labels